"The Business" is a song by Dutch DJ and producer Tiësto, with uncredited vocals from James "Yami" Bell. It was released on 25 September 2020 as the lead single from his upcoming seventh studio album Drive.

At the APRA Music Awards of 2022, the song was nominated for Most Performed International Work.

Music video
The music video premiered on Tiësto's official YouTube channel on 24 September 2020. Directed by Christian Breslauer, it features US dancers Casey Frey and Kyla Bullings. According to Jason Heffler from edm.com, Frey's "intoxicating dance interpretation is a fantastic accompaniment to the haunting sonic flair".

Cover art 
The cover art was made by the visual artist Victor Scorrano.

Remixes 
A remix by British DJ and producer 220 Kid was released on 11 December 2020, which premiered on Tiësto's YouTube channel. There is also another version, titled "The Business Part II", which is a collaboration with US hip-hop/R&B artist Ty Dolla Sign, released on 21 January 2021.

Formats and releases
Digital download - Europe
 "The Business" – 2:44

Digital download - US
 "The Business" (Extended Mix) – 3:46
 "The Business" – 2:44

Digital download - 220 Kid Remix
 "The Business" (220 Kid Remix) - 3:19
 "The Business" - 2:44

Digital download - It's Dynamite Remix
 "The Business" (It's Dynamite Remix) - 1:17

Digital download - Part II
 "The Business Part II" - 2:44
 "The Business" - 2:44

Digital download - Part II (Clean Bandit Remix)
 "The Business Part II" (Clean Bandit Remix) - 3:04
 "The Business Part II" - 2:44
 "The Business" - 2:44

Digital download - SWACQ Remix
 "The Business" (SWACQ Remix) - 2:49

Digital download - Vintage Culture & Dubdogz Remix
 "The Business" (Vintage Culture & Dubdogz Remix) - 3:09

Digital download - Remixes
 "The Business" (Vintage Culture & Dubdogz Remix) - 3:09
 "The Business" (SWACQ Remix) - 2:49
 "The Business" (220 Kid Remix) - 3:19
 "The Business" (Sparkee Remix) - 3:02
 "The Business Part II" (Clean Bandit Remix) - 3:04
 "The Business Part II" - 2:44

Charts

Weekly charts

Year-end charts

Certifications

Usage in media
"The Business" appeared in the opening montage of Hockey Night in Canada's coverage of Game 4 of the 2021 Stanley Cup Finals between the Montreal Canadiens and the Tampa Bay Lightning. It has also been used as the music that precedes kick off in every match of the 2022 FIFA World Cup in Qatar.

Release history

See also
List of number-one dance singles of 2021 (Australia)
List of top 10 singles for 2021 in Australia
List of Dutch Top 40 number-one singles of 2021
List of number-one singles of 2021 (Ireland)
List of top 10 singles in 2021 (Ireland)
List of Airplay 100 number ones of the 2020s
List of Media Forest most-broadcast songs of the 2020s in Romania
 The Box

References

2020 songs
2020 singles
Tiësto songs
Songs written by Tiësto
Dutch Top 40 number-one singles
Irish Singles Chart number-one singles
Number-one singles in Hungary
Number-one singles in Romania
Songs written by Anton Rundberg